XXX  is a 2018 Hindi-language erotic comedy-drama web series directed by Ken Ghosh for the video on demand platform ALT Balaji. It stars Kyra Dutt, Aparnaa Bajpai, Rithvik Dhanjani, Shantanu Maheshwari, Ankit Gera, Pryanca Talukdar and Aparna Sharma.

Principal photography of the planned film began in April 2015 and the film was scheduled to be released in 2016 but due to censorship issues, it would be released on the web platform Alt Balaji on 27 September 2018 as a web series. The trailer was released on 20 September 2018.

This show also available on ZEE5 but later they removed the whole show from their OTT platform because of the obscenity.

Cast

Season 1

Bigg Bosss!
 Ankit Gera as Bunty (Big Boss)
 Priyanka Talukdar as Mallaika
 Rajat Rawell as Monty
 RJ Malishka as Kinky
 Vandana Sajnani as Pinky
 Flora Saini as Rukmani Ji

Sumitra G
 Shantanu Maheshwari as Bittu
 Aparna Sharma as Chandani (Sumitra Ji - in serial)
 Pawan Chopra as Bittu's Dad
 Karan Jotwani as Chandani's Boyfriend (Sumitra Ji's Son - in serial)
 Shashi Sharma as Daadi

Bidai
 Aparnaa Bajpai as Dulhan (The Bride)
 Rajesh Desai as Mannu (The Groom)
 Pratima Kazmi as Mannu's Mother
 Raj Gopal as Mannu's Father
 Tumul Balyan as Thief
Sunny Charles as Bride's Father
 Anapurna as Bride's Mother
 Raj Gopal as Father-in-law
 Pratima Kazmi as Mother-in-law

Chota Vishal
 Aadar Malik as Vishal
 Sanket Bhosale as Chota Vishal (Voice-Over)
 Nehal Shah as Shilpa
 Raina Basnet as Hooker
 Manisha as Female Employee

The Climax
 Rithvik Dhanjani as Mayank
 Kyra Dutt as Kayra & Mayra (Double Role)

Special appearance 
 Scarlett Mellish Wilson as item number in title track

Season 2: Uncensored

Pyaar Aur Plastic
 Aaditi Kohli as Pam
 Parree Pande as Priya
 Ribbhu Mehra as Sanjay

Bose DK Bhaag
 Nia Sharma

Triple Seat- X.X.X
 Thea D ‘Souza as Shanaya 
 Paras Tomar as Kunal
 Pratik Sehajpal as Arijit

Sampoorn Rishta
 Aakash Chaudhary as Rahul 
 Jashn Agnihotri as Alka 
 Samiksha Bhatnagar as Myra
 Aabha Paul

Insecure Husband
 Garima Jain as Kavya
 Sumit Satija as Vihaan 
 Mohit Kumar as Aarav

Season 2

Episodes 
X.X.X. Uncensored is available on the streaming service ALT Balaji. All 5 episodes were released simultaneously on 27 September 2018, as opposed to a serialised format, to encourage binge-watching. A sixth episode was also released three months later, as the season finale.

Controversy
An FIR has been filed against filmmaker Ekta Kapoor alleging an insult to the national emblem, Hindu gods and army personnel in Alt Balaji's XXX web series. Ekta's representatives have since said that the controversial scene has been removed.

References

External links
 
 

2018 web series debuts
Hindi-language web series
ALTBalaji original programming
Indian drama web series
Erotic web series